The 2020 America East women's basketball tournament began on March 4 and was cancelled on March 12 prior to its scheduled conclusion.  Maine was the defending champion. The winner would have advanced to the 2020 NCAA tournament which was also cancelled in efforts to curtail the spread of COVID-19.

Seeds
Teams are seeded by record within the conference, with a tiebreaker system to seed teams with identical conference records.

Schedule
All tournament games are nationally televised on an ESPN network:

Bracket and Results
Teams are reseeded after each round with highest remaining seeds receiving home court advantage.

* denotes number of overtime periods

All times listed are Eastern

See also
 2020 America East men's basketball tournament

References

External links
 2020 America East Women's Basketball Championship

Tournament
America East Conference women's basketball tournament
America East women's basketball tournament